The Helios Suns are a men's professional basketball club based in Domžale, Slovenia. The club competes in the Slovenian First League and the ABA League Second Division. They have won the national league in the 2006–07 and 2015–16 seasons. Since 1981, their main sponsor is local chemical company Helios. Their home arena is Komunalni center Hall.

History
In August 2014, the team changed its name from KK Helios Domžale to Helios Suns.

Players

Current roster

Head coaches 
The following is a list of head coaches since 2005:
  Memi Bečirović, July 2005 – June 2007
  Zoran Martič, June 2007 – June 2008
  Rade Mijanović, June 2008 – December 2008
  Radovan Trifunović, December 2008 – February 2010
  Ivan Sunara, February 2010 – May 2010
  Radovan Trifunović, June 2010 – June 2011
  Zmago Sagadin, June 2011 – May 2014
  Gregor Hafnar, June 2014 – January 2015
  Gašper Okorn, January 2015 – December 2015
  Jakša Vulić, December 2015 – January 2017
  Dejan Čikić, January 2017 – May 2017
  Jovan Beader, May 2017 – November 2018
  Dejan Jakara, November 2018 – present

Honours

League
Slovenian First League
Winners: 2006–07, 2015–16
Runners-up: 2007–08, 2008–09, 2021–22

Cup
Slovenian Cup
Winners: 2007
Runners-up: 2008, 2011, 2013, 2022, 2023

Slovenian Supercup
Runners-up: 2007, 2008, 2016, 2022

Regional
Alpe Adria Cup
Winners: 2015–16
Runners-up: 2016–17

European matches
All results (home and away) list Helios Suns's score tally first.

References

External links
Official website 

Basketball teams established in 1949
Basketball teams in Slovenia
1949 establishments in Slovenia
Basketball teams in Yugoslavia